The traditional lighting equipment of Japan includes the , the , the , and the .

The  is a lamp consisting of paper stretched over a frame of bamboo, wood or metal. The paper protected the flame from the wind. Burning oil in a stone, metal, or ceramic holder, with a wick of cotton or pith, provided the light. They were usually open on the top and bottom, with one side that could be lifted to provide access. Rapeseed oil was popular. Candles were also used, but their higher price made them less popular. A lower-priced alternative was sardine oil.

The  became popular in the Edo period (1603–1867). The  was most common indoors. Many had a vertical box shape with an inner stand for the light. Some had a drawer on the bottom to facilitate refilling and lighting. A handle on top made it portable. One explanation attributes it to Kobori Enshu, who lived in the late Azuchi-Momoyama period and early Edo period. Tubular in shape, it had an opening instead of a drawer. The  under the eaves of a shop, often bearing the name of the merchant, was a common sight in the towns.

The expression , or "daytime lamp," meant someone or something that seemed to serve no purpose. In dramatizations of the story of the forty-seven ronin, Oishi Yoshio is often given this description.

The  is a kind of Japanese paper lamp used in the open during festivals. It normally has an hexagonal profile and a rather wide, open top. It can either hang from a wire or stand on a pole. Artists paint on the about 400  erected for the occasion on the shrine's grounds.

A relative of the Chinese paper lantern, the  has a frame of split bamboo wound in a spiral. Paper or silk protect the flame from wind. The spiral structure permits it to be collapsed into the basket at the bottom. The  is used outdoors, either carried or hung outside the house. The earliest record of a  dates to 1085, and one appears in a 1536 illustration.

Originally used in the broad sense to mean any lantern, the term  came to refer to a lamp of stone, bronze, iron, wood, or another heavy material. These illuminate the grounds of Buddhist temples, Shinto shrines, Japanese gardens, and other places that include tradition in their decor. The earlier use of oil and candles has in the modern day been replaced by electric bulbs.

Stone

Bronze

Wooden

See also 

Physalis alkekengi, the Japanese lantern plant

References

External links 
 Japanese Gardening, Lanterns. Accessed on February 2, 2010

Japanese culture
Japan
Light fixtures